My Husband and I was a short-lived black-and-white British sitcom starring Evelyn Laye and her husband Frank Lawton, who played themselves. It ran for seven episodes in 1956. My Husband and I was written by Geoffrey Kerr and James Leasor. It was made for the ITV network by Associated-Rediffusion.

Cast
Evelyn Laye - Herself
Frank Lawton - Himself
Linda Gray - Molly
Peter Collingwood - Jennings
Alicia Massy-Beresford - Jane

Plot
My Husband and I was a typical domestic sitcom made for the refined husband and wife team Evelyn Laye and Frank Lawton. As well as typical comedy situations for domestic sitcoms, My Husband and I also featured humorous songs.

Episodes
Episode One (20 July 1956) 
Episode Two (3 August 1956)
Episode Three (17 August 1956)
Episode Four (31 August 1956)
Episode Five (14 September 1956)
Episode Six (28 September 1956)
Episode Seven (12 October 1956)

All seven episodes were later wiped, and none of them exist in the television archives as of 2009.

References
Mark Lewisohn, "Radio Times Guide to TV Comedy", BBC Worldwide Ltd, 2003
British Sitcom Guide for My Husband and I

External links 
 

1956 British television series debuts
1956 British television series endings
1950s British sitcoms
ITV sitcoms
English-language television shows
Television shows produced by Associated-Rediffusion